Sheboygan South High School is a public coeducational high school serving approximately 1,335 students in grades 9-12. Located on the south side of Sheboygan, Wisconsin, it is part of the Sheboygan Area School District. The school has a rivalry with the cross-town Sheboygan North High School.

History 
The school opened in 1960 in the midst of a population shift toward the south side of Sheboygan and the Town of Wilson. It was a replacement for the former Sheboygan Central High School (established in 1884 as Sheboygan High School, renamed to Central High School in 1938), located in the city's downtown, which is now the site of several charter and alternative programs. The original mascot (Redmen) and newspaper/yearbook names (Lake Breeze) carried over from Central.

The school has undergone three major expansions. In 1998, a new library, commons/cafeteria space and classrooms were added, and a more significant expansion occurred in 2005–2006, with the addition of more classrooms, a new indoor athletic complex, and new tennis courts. Naming rights for the school's new gymnasium were acquired by Acuity Insurance, with the weight room/fitness center being sponsored by Aurora Health Care and open to use by the public outside of school hours. The most recent expansion in 2016 was privately financed and sponsored by several local companies, including Kohler and Sargento, which saw a new administrative office area constructed by the commons on the south site of the building, and a new metal/auto shop. In June 2017, after the office moved to the new area, the school's address was officially changed to 1240 Washington Avenue, ending 57 years of holding the 3128 South 12th Street address.

In the recent past, the Acuity Gymnasium played host to a private Fifth Harmony concert on March 19, 2014 sponsored by Milwaukee radio station WXSS and won by South High students in a school spirit contest involving clothing donations to Goodwill Industries. It also played host to a Bernie Sanders rally for his 2016 presidential campaign on April 1 of that year.

The school's athletic teams are nicknamed the Redwings, with the school colors being red, white and black. Until 1993 the nickname was the Redmen, carried over from Central. When concerns over the racial implications of the Native American name were broached, a long debate among students, faculty, alumni and the community at large resulted in a change, one of the first in the state of Wisconsin to be settled long before the May 2010 implementation of a state law allowing easier challenges of Native American nicknames (later repealed in 2013), and one of the first computer-designed high school logos in the pre-Internet age of desktop publishing. One remnant of the former Redmen name still exists in a mosaic profile of an Indian chief on the front facade of the school's auditorium.

Notable alumni
Bill Schroeder, professional football player
Roy Pirrung, ultramarathoner

Images

See also
 WSHS-FM
 List of high schools in Wisconsin

References

External links
 Sheboygan South High School

High schools in Sheboygan, Wisconsin
Educational institutions established in 1960
Public high schools in Wisconsin
1960 establishments in Wisconsin